This list includes notable alumni, non-matriculating, faculty, and staff of what is now Iowa State University (ISU).

Academia

Art and design

Design

Performing arts

Business

Government and politics

United States

U.S. Vice Presidents 
Henry A. Wallace (1888–1965), Animal Husbandry B.A. 1910, Vice President of the United States (1941-1945), United States Secretary of Agriculture (1933-1940), United States Secretary of Commerce (1945-1946), and founder of Pioneer Hi-Bred, a producer of hybrid seeds for agriculture.

U.S. Cabinet
Lauro Cavazos (born 1927), Economics PhD 1954, U.S. Secretary of Education (1988-1990).
Ezra Taft Benson (1899–1994), Agriculture Economics M.S. 1927, U.S. Secretary of Agriculture (1953-1961), and 13th President of the Church of Jesus Christ of Latter-day Saints.
Henry C. Wallace (1866–1924), B.A. Diary Science 1892, U.S. Secretary of Agriculture (1921-1924), father of U.S. Vice President Henry A. Wallace.

U.S. Governors 
Kim Reynolds (born 1959), degree concentrations in Political Science, Business Management, and Communications B.L.S. 2016, Lieutenant Governor of Iowa (2011-2017), the 43rd Governor of Iowa (2017–present).
Garrey Carruthers (born 1939), Economics PhD 1968, Governor of New Mexico (1987–1991); president and CEO of Cimarron Health Plan.
Robert D. Blue, Governor of Iowa (1945-1949), Lieutenant Governor of Iowa (1943-1945), Speaker of the Iowa House of Representatives (1941-1943).
Bourke B. Hickenlooper (1896–1971), Industrial Science B.A. 1919, Governor of Iowa (1943–1945) and longtime U.S. Senator (1945–1969).
John Edward Jones (1840–1896), class of 1865, eighth Governor of Nevada(1895-1896).
Frank D. Jackson (1854-1938), Governor of Iowa (1894-1896), and Iowa Secretary of State (1885-1891).
James Benton Grant (1848-1911), attended and then transferred to Cornell, Governor of Colorado (1883-1885).

U.S. Senators 

 Joni Ernst (born 1970), Psychology B.A. 1992, United States Senator from Iowa since 2015, Lieutenant Colonel (retired) Iowa Army National Guard (1993–2015).
 Tom Harkin (born 1939), Government and Economics B.A. 1962, United States Senator from Iowa (1985–2015), United States Representative from Iowa's 5th congressional district (1975-1985), and author of Americans with Disabilities Act of 1990 (ADA).
 Herbert E. Hitchcock (1867-1958), attended but didn't graduate, United States senator from South Dakota (1936-1938).

U.S. Representatives 

Randy Feenstra (born 1969), MPA, United States Representative from Iowa's 4th congressional district (2021–present).
Dave Loebsack (born 1952), B.S 1974 and M.A. 1976, United States Representative from Iowa's 2nd congressional district (2007-2021).
Bruce Braley (born 1957), B.A. 1980, United States Representative from Iowa's 1st congressional district (2007–2015).
Tom Latham (born 1948), attended but did not graduate, United States Representative from Iowa's 4th congressional district (1995–2015).
T. Cooper Evans (1924-2005), B.S. & M.S., United States Representative from Iowa's 3rd congressional district (1981-1987).
Berkley Bedell (1921–2019), attended for two years but did not graduate, United States Representative from Iowa's 6th congressional district (1975–1987).

U.S. Ambassadors 
James Pettit (born1956), B.A. International Studies, U.S. Ambassador to Moldova (2015-2018).
Dan Mozena (born 1949), History and Government B.S. 1970, U.S. Ambassador to Angola (2007-2010), and U.S. Ambassador to Bangladesh (2011-2015).
Charles Manatt (1936–2011), Rural Sociology B.A. 1958, U.S. Ambassador to the Dominican Republic (1999-2001) and Chairman of the Democratic National Committee (1981-1985).

State of Iowa Officials 
 Mary Mosiman, (born 1962), B.S. Accounting 1999, Iowa State Auditor (2013-2019).
 Bill Northey (born 1959), Agricultural Business B.A. 1981, Iowa Secretary of Agriculture (2007-2018).
 Kraig Paulsen (born 1964), Speaker of the Iowa House of Representatives (2011-2015).
 Sally Pederson (born 1951), class of 1973, former Lieutenant Governor of Iowa(1999-2007).
 Elaine Szymoniak (1920–2009), Family Environment M.A. 1977, Iowa State Senator (1988–2000).
 Jo Ann Zimmerman (1936-2019), took graduate classes but did not receive a degree, first female Lieutenant Governor of Iowa (1987-1991) and member of the Iowa House of Representatives (1983-1987).
 Dale M. Cochran (1928-2018), B.A. Agriculture 1950, Iowa Secretary of Agriculture (1987-1999), Speaker of the Iowa House of Representatives (1975-1979), member of the Iowa House (1965-1987).
 Maurice E. Baringer, (1921-2011), B.A. & M.A. Animal Husbandry (1949), Treasurer of Iowa (1969-1983), Speaker of the Iowa House of Representatives (1967-1969).
 Dayton Countryman, (1918-2011), B.S. Forestry 1940, Attorney General of Iowa (1955–57).
 Clem F. Kimball,(1868-1928), B.A. Mechanical Engineering, Lieutenant Governor of Iowa (1925-1928).
 William C. Hayward, (1847-1917), did not graduate, Iowa Secretary of State (1907-1913).
 E. Thurman Gaskill (born 1935), Commissioner of both Iowa's Department of Economic Development and its Department of Natural Resources, president of Iowa Corn Growers Association, president of National Corn Growers Association, chairman of the United States Feed Grains Council.

Other U.S. Officials
Katharine Abraham (born 1954), B.S. Economics 1976, Commissioner of the Bureau of Labor Statistics (1993–2001), member of the Council of Economic Advisers under President Obama (2011-2013).
Scott Stanzel, B.A. 1995, deputy press secretary at the White House in the George W. Bush administration.
Trudy Huskamp Peterson, B.S. 1967, Archivist of the United States (1993–1995).
Steven VanRoekel, Management of Information Systems B.A. 1994, second Federal Chief Information Officer of the United States.
Robert W. Sennewald, B.A. 1951, Commanding General, United States Army Forces Command (1984-1986).
Harvey Gantt (born 1943), transferred to Clemson University becoming the first black student to be admitted, Mayor of Charlotte, NC (1983-1987).
James Clark Jr. (1918-2006), B.A. Animal Husbandry (1941), President of the Maryland State Senate(1979-1983).
Jon Lindgren (born 1938), B.S. 1960, Mayor of Fargo, North Dakota, 1978–1994 and pioneering LGBT supporter.
Gwynn Garnett (1909–1995), B.S. 1934, administrator of the Foreign Agricultural Service from 1955 to 1959 and author of the first draft of what would become the Food for Peace program.
Spencer Haven (1868–1938), B.S. 1890, Attorney General of Wisconsin (1918–1919).
Willet M. Hays (1859-1928), M.A. Agriculture 1885, U. S. Assistant Secretary of Agriculture (1904-1913).
Bayard T. Hainer (1860-1933), B.S. 1884, justice of the Territorial Oklahoma Supreme Court (1898-1907).
Thomas Harris MacDonald (1881–1957), Civil Engineering B.S. 1904, led the development of the Interstate Highway System.
Elwood Mead (1858–1936), Civil Engineering PhD 1883, commissioner of U.S. Bureau of Reclamation during construction of the Hoover Dam, namesake of Lake Mead.

International

Heads of state and government 

 John Garang (1945–2005), Economics PhD 1981, former commander of SPLA and former Vice President of Sudan.
 Parviz Davoodi (born 1952), Economics PhD 1981, first Vice President of Iran.
Lee Teng-hui (born 1923), Agricultural Economics M.S. 1953, former President of the Republic of China (Taiwan).

Cabinet ministers 

 Isa Kalantari (born 1952), PhD Agricultural Physiology, Vice President for the Environment of Iran (2017-2021), Minister of Agriculture (1988-2001).
 Sawsan Ali Sharifi (born 1956), Animal Science M.S. 1981 and PhD 1983, former Iraqi Minister of Agriculture in 2004.
 Luis Ernesto Derbez (born 1947), Economics PhD 1980, current academic rector for the Universidad de las Américas Puebla (UDLAP), former Mexican Secretary of Foreign Affairs (2003–2006) and Secretary of Economics (2000–2002).

Other figures 

 Jalaluddin Rakhmat (1949–2021), Communications and Psychology 1981, Member of the People's Representative Council (2014–2019).
 Chen Min-jen, Nuclear Engineering PhD 1983, member of the Legislative Yuan (2005-2008).
 Anthony Worth, Lord Lieutenant of Lincolnshire.
 Fred Grimwade (1933-1989), President of the Victorian Legislative Council (1979-1985).

Activists 
Carrie Chapman Catt (1859–1947), General Science B.S 1880, leader of women's suffrage movement and founder of the League of Women Voters.
Frank J. Christensen (born 1961), American Labor Leader.
Vine Deloria, Jr. (1933–2005), General Science B.S 1958, Native American rights leader and author.

Journalism 
Terry A. Anderson, B.A. 1974, former Middle East Bureau Chief, The Associated Press
 Sally Jacobsen, B.A., journalist and foreign correspondent, first woman to serve as international editor of the Associated Press
 Arendo Joustra, attended Graduate School, Department of Journalism and Mass Communication, 1979–1980 – Dutch writer and editor in chief Elsevier
Robert E. Kowalski, B.A. 1966, M.S. 1977, bestselling medical author
John Madson, 1951 (wildlife biology), freelance writer (outdoor sports periodicals); became independent scholar of tallgrass prairie ecology  
Sean McLaughlin, B.A. journalism, former Today Show weather anchor
Christine Romans, B.A. 1993, CNN Chief Business Correspondent
Hugh Sidey, B.S.,  journalist for Life and Time magazines

Pulitzer Prize winning journalists 
Robert L. Bartley (1937–2003), B.A. 1959, recipient of the 1980 Pulitzer Prize for Editorial Writing; editor of The Wall Street Journal opinion page, vice-president of Dow Jones & Company.
Tom Knudson, Journalism B.A. 1980, two-time Pulitzer Prize winner in 1985 and 1992.
Ted Kooser (born 1939), B.S. 1962, U.S. Poet Laureate (in 2004–2006) and recipient of the 2005 Pulitzer Prize for Poetry.
Lauren K. Soth (1911–1998), Agriculture Journalism B.A. 1932 and Agriculture Economics M.S. 1938, he was the recipient of the 1956 Pulitzer Prize for Editorial Writing.
Jennifer Jacobs, journalist and a senior White House correspondent for Bloomberg News.

Science and technology

Aerospace engineering and mechanical engineering 
 Clayton Anderson (born 1959), M.S. 1983, NASA astronaut; first Iowa State Alum in space
 Steve Bales (born 1942), Aerospace Engineering B.S. 1964, director, Space Operations Management Office at NASA; known for the Apollo 11 landing.
 Clarence Chamberlin (attended but did not graduate), aviation pioneer
Firouz Naderi (born 1946), Mechanical Engineering  B.S. 1969, Iranian-American, served 36 years at NASA's Jet Propulsion Laboratory (JPL), also has an asteroid named after him, "5515 Naderi".
 Sadanand Joshi, Ph.D. 1980, president of Joshi Technologies International, Inc. (JTI) and a petroleum engineer, he contributed in developing horizontal well technology to produce crude oil and natural gas.

Agriculture sciences, plant sciences, and food science 
 Griffith Buck (1915–1991), B.S. 1948, M.S. 1949, Ph.D. 1953, professor of horticulture; developed nearly 100 new varieties of roses
 George Washington Carver (1860s–1943), B.S. 1894, M.S. 1896, American botanist and inventor, the first African-American student and the first African-American faculty member at ISU.
 Michael Grimes, MS 1922, PhD 1923, Irish scientist and first professor of microbiology at University College Cork
 Charlotte Maria King (1864-1937), botanist, mycologist and agronomist.
 Edward F. Knipling (1909–2000), Entomology Ph.D. 1947, he was a noted entomologist and World Food Prize winner for his work on developing the sterile insect technique for eradicating or suppressing the threat posed by pests to the livestock and crops that contribute to the world's food supply.
 Rose Marie Pangborn (1932–1990), Food M.S. 1955, she was a food scientist, food technologist, a pioneer in the field of sensory analysis of food attributes, and professor at University of California, Davis.
, Utah State University Research Professor Emeritus and Cornell University Roy A. Young Scientist Emeritus Chair, helped to form the subdiscipline of biological pest control, known for studying Metarhizium
James A. Slater (1920–2008), Ph.D. 1950, he was a noted entomologist, specialist in the study of heteroptera, and professor at the University of Connecticut.
 G. Malcolm Trout, B.S. 1923, M.S. 1924, noted food scientist and creator of homogenized milk

Chemistry and biochemistry 
 Julian Banzon (1908–1988), Biochemistry Ph.D. 1940, biochemist, National Scientist of the Philippines
 Lawrence F. Dahl, Ph.D. 1956, professor emeritus of chemistry at the University of Wisconsin–Madison
 Velmer A. Fassel, Ph.D. 1947, chemist, creator of inductively coupled plasma for mass spectrometry
 Lyle Goodhue, B.S. 1928, M.S. 1929, Ph.D. 1934, he was an inventor, research chemist and entomologist.
 Darleane C. Hoffman, B.S. 1948, nuclear chemist, part of the team that discovered Seaborgium, faculty senior scientist in the Nuclear Science Division of Lawrence Berkeley National Laboratory and a professor in the graduate school at University of California, Berkeley.

Computer engineering 
Dale A. Anderson, M.S. 1959, Ph.D. 1964, pioneer in the field of computational fluid dynamics
John Vincent Atanasoff (1903–1995), ISU Math M.S. 1926, (see also Atanasoff–Berry Computer), inventor of the first electronic digital computer
Clifford E. Berry, (1918–1963), B.S. 1939, MS 1941, Ph.D. 1948, (see also Atanasoff–Berry Computer), co-developer of the first electronic digital computer
Bob O. Evans, B.S. 1951, computer pioneer and National Medal of Technology recipient
John Gustafson, M.S. 1981, Ph.D. 1982, computer scientist and businessman, chiefly known for his work in High Performance Computing (HPC) such as the invention of Gustafson's law of parallel computing, introducing the first commercial computer cluster.
Tom M. Whitney, BS 1961, MS 1962, Ph.D. 1964, co-inventor of the first handheld calculator able to perform trigonometry, and former executive vice-president of engineering at Apple Inc.

Mathematics 
Albert Turner Bharucha-Reid, mathematician, probability and Markov chain theorist
Arthur E. Bryson, Jr., "father of modern optimal control theory"
Gertrude Cox B.S. 1929, American statistician, president of American Statistical Association in 1956 and the first woman elected into International Statistical Institute
Wayne Fuller, B.S. 1955, M.S. 1957, Ph.D. 1959, statistician
Hadley Wickham, Ph.D. 2008, New Zealand statistician, elected fellow of American Statistical Association in 2015, known for ggplot2 and tidy data

Medical sciences 
Nancy Cox BS 1970, American virologist at the Centers for Disease Control and Prevention, 2006 U.S. Federal Employee of the Year; one of the 2006 Time 100
Mark Mattson, BS 1979, prominent neuroscientist
Emil Steinberger, M.D. 1955, endocrinologist, founding president of the American Society of Andrology

Sports

Baseball 
Mike Busch, former Major League Baseball player
Mike Myers, Major League Baseball player
Jim Walewander, former Major League Baseball player

Basketball

Football

Mixed martial arts 
Mike Van Arsdale, 1988 NCAA Division 1 Wrestling Champion; current MMA coach
Justin Eilers, collegiate Football player; retired professional MMA fighter

Olympics 
Glen Brand, 3 time All-American wrestler; 1948 Summer Olympics Gold Medalist in freestyle wrestling
Dan Gable, Lost only one collegiate wrestling match; 1972 Olympic gold medalist and 1971 World Wrestling Champion, became top wrestling coach in the country at the University of Iowa
Kevin Jackson, 1992 Olympic Freestyle Wrestling Champion, former mixed martial artist, former head coach for ISU Cyclone Wrestling
Nawal El Moutawakel, first African woman and first Muslim woman to earn Olympic gold
Ben Peterson, 2 time NCAA Champion wrestler at Iowa State; 1972 & 1976 Olympic gold and silver medalist respectfully
Cael Sanderson, 4 time NCAA undefeated wrestling champion (159–0) and 2004 Summer Olympics gold medalist, head coach of the Penn State wrestling team
Jake Varner, 2012 Summer Olympics Gold Medalist

Track 
Yobes Ondieki, 10000-meter world record-holder, 1993.

Cross country 
Lisa Uhl, four-time NCAA Division One champion, current NCAA record holder in the 10,000 meters

Wrestling 
Darryl Peterson, NCAA all American and former professional wrestler
Trevor Smith, ISU wrestler; professional mixed martial artist currently competing in the UFC's Middleweight Division
Justin Wren (attended), originally had a wrestling scholarship but had an injury, professional fighter currently for Bellator MMA

Ultramarathon 
Pete Kostelnick, 2015 1st Place Badwater 135 Ultramarathon, 23hr 27min 10sec

Notable faculty and staff

Nobel laureates
Dan Shechtman, (2011, Nobel Prize in Chemistry), for "the discovery of quasicrystals"
Theodore Schultz, (1979, Nobel Memorial Prize in Economics), for "pioneering research into economic development research with particular consideration of the problems of developing countries""
 Leonid Hurwicz, (2007, Nobel Memorial Prize in Economics), for having laid the foundations of mechanism design theory
George Stigler, (1982, Nobel Memorial Prize in Economics), for his contribution on capture theory

Pulitzer Prize
Jane Smiley, recipient of the 1992 Pulitzer Prize for fiction

Government and politics 
 James Wilson (1835–1920), professor who later became United States Secretary of Agriculture, Dean of Agriculture and director of the agricultural experiment station from 1890 to 1897.

Arts

Literature
Charlotte H. Bruner, scholar and translator of African women's literature
Fern Kupfer, novelist
Joseph Geha, award winning author

Visual arts 

 Christian Petersen, sculptor, whose works appear around campus
 Priscilla Kepner Sage, textile artist

Science and technology

Agriculture sciences, plant sciences, and food science 

 Raymond Arritt, agricultural meteorology 1993 to 2018
 Jay L. Lush, pioneer of modern animal breeding
 Albert M. Ten Eyck, President of the American Society of Agronomy
 J. (Hans) van Leeuwen, emeritus professor of Civil, Construction and Environmental Engineering at ISU, and developer of MycoMeal fungal feed and purified alcohol

Chemistry and biochemistry 
 John B. Balinsky, biochemist, physiologist, chair of zoology
 L. K. Doraiswamy, Chemical engineer, proponent of Organic synthesis engineering and Padma Bhushan winner
 Henry Gilman, known as the "father of organometallic chemistry"
 Nellie May Naylor (1885–1992), An influential chemistry professor at Iowa State University, one of the earliest female chemistry professors at ISU, teaching between 1908 until 1955.
 Frank Spedding, noted Ames Laboratory chemist, namesake of Spedding Prize

Computer science and engineering 
 John Vincent Atanasoff (1903–1995), ISU Math M.S. 1926, (see also Atanasoff–Berry Computer), inventor of the first electronic digital computer
 Mary Clem (1905–1979), mathematician, and human computer; she led the computing lab at ISU.
Carolina Cruz-Neira, a pioneer of virtual reality (VR) technology, former ISU faculty and 2002 co-founder of the Virtual Reality Applications Center

Military technology 
James Millikin Bevans, U.S. Air Force Major General
James Lorraine Geddes (1827–1887), American Civil War general; Acting University President in 1875–77.
Roy L. Kline, Brigadier general, USMC

Mathematics 
Wayne Arthur Fuller, statistician noted for his textbooks on econometrics and survey sampling
Oscar Kempthorne, a statistician and geneticist, and Distinguished Professor of Science and Humanities at Iowa State University
George W. Snedecor, statistician and pioneer of modern applied statistics in the U.S., namesake of Snedecor Award

Medicine 
Elsa Murano, former Iowa State University assistant professor in the Department of Microbiology, Immunology and Preventative Medicine; 23rd President of Texas A&M University

Physics 
Allan Mackintosh, noted solid-state physicist, director of Nordic Institute for Theoretical Physics

Sports

Basketball
Larry Eustachy, former men's basketball coach, 2000 NCAA National Coach of the Year
Tim Floyd, former men's basketball coach with 81–49 record and first coach with three consecutive 20-win seasons.
Johnny Orr, the most successful coach in Iowa State and Michigan men's basketball history

Football
Mack Brown, head coach at University of Texas (at Iowa State 1979–1982)
Pete Carroll, head coach of the Seattle Seahawks, former coach at University of Southern California (at Iowa State 1978)
Tom Herman, head coach at University of Texas (at Iowa State 2009–2011)
Johnny Majors, renowned football head coach (at Iowa State 1968–1972)

Martial arts
Yong Chin Pak, Grandmaster, instructs taekwondo, hapkido, and judo

Sociology

Presidents of Iowa State University

References